Lee Se-yeon (born 11 July 1945) is a former South Korean footballer.

International career
Lee Se-yeon is regarded as one of the greatest South Korean goalkeepers of the 20th century. He conceded 55 goals in 81 caps, and won nine Asian titles including the 1970 Asian Games with South Korea national team.

South Korea had fierce atmosphere when playing with Japan at the time, because it hadn't been long since Korea had gained independence from Japan. Lee also had a strong sense of the rivalry against Japan. A clash between Lee and Kunishige Kamamoto attracted attention for a while in South Korea. South Korea recorded five wins, three draws and one loss in nine games against Japan while he played for the national team.

Style of play
Lee was strong on aerial duels by learning artistic gymnastics, although he had short height.

Career statistics

International

Honours 
Yangzee
Korean National Championship: 1968
Korean President's Cup: 1968
Asian Champion Club Tournament runner-up: 1969

Korea Trust Bank
Korean Semi-professional League (Spring): 1971
Korean Semi-professional League (Autumn): 1973
Korean National Championship runner-up: 1971

South Korea
Asian Games: 1970
AFC Asian Cup runner-up: 1972

Individual
Korean FA Best XI: 1969, 1970, 1971, 1972

References

External links 
Lee Se-yeon – National Team Stats at KFA 

South Korean footballers
South Korea international footballers
Association football goalkeepers
Medalists at the 1970 Asian Games
Asian Games medalists in football
1972 AFC Asian Cup players
1945 births
Living people
Asian Games gold medalists for South Korea
Footballers at the 1970 Asian Games
Kyung Hee University alumni